The Powhatan Arrow was one of the named passenger trains of the Norfolk and Western. Its route ran from Norfolk, Virginia, to Cincinnati, Ohio. 

Train 25 left Norfolk at 7:00 am, and made the 565 mile run to Portsmouth, Ohio, in 12 hours 50 minutes. The remaining 111.6 miles to Cincinnati took nearly 3 hours as the train performed all the local work on that stretch of line.

In the reverse direction, Train 26 left Cincinnati at 8:10 am and Portsmouth at 11:10, arriving in Norfolk at 11:55 pm.

The motive power for the Powhatan Arrow was built by the Roanoke Shops of Norfolk and Western located in Roanoke, Virginia.  The train was given its name from a name submission contest offered by Norfolk and Western, the winner of which was Mr. Leonard Allen Scott of Dry Branch, Virginia. His entry (among over 140,000) was sent out in the last sack of mail picked up by the mail train in Parrott the day of the deadline for postmarks. The Arrow made its maiden run on April 28, 1946, and quickly became one of the most popular of Norfolk and Western's passenger trains. It and its J-class powered companions traveled approximately 15,000 miles per month and may have traveled nearly three million miles in its lifetime.

Background and class history
Among the most famous steam power of the N&W were the 4-8-4 J class steam locomotives, which pulled N&W's crack passenger trains such as the Cavalier, the Pocahontas and the Powhatan Arrow, as well as ferrying the Southern Railway's Tennessean and Pelican between Monroe, Virginia, and Bristol, Tennessee. During late 1944 and early 1945, a test on the Pennsylvania Railroad, one of the Js No. 610 achieved 110 mph with a fifteen car, 1050-ton train along one section of flat, straight track between Crestline, Ohio and Chicago, Illinois. This was remarkable performance for a 70-inch drivered reciprocating steam locomotive. But the only time the "J"s were able to do anything like that on N&W rails was on the eastern portion of the line, between Petersburg and Norfolk. The average speed of the Arrow between Norfolk and Cincinnati, with much of the route through the mountains, was only about 43 mph. The "J"s were numbered from 600 through 613, and were built in three groups from 1941 to 1950. The only surviving member of this famous class of locomotives is No. 611, currently operational.

In 1949, the N&W ordered sufficient passenger cars to re-equip the Powhattan Arrow completely and the Pocohontas partially. The consist for the new Powhattan Arrow included two 48-seat coaches with crew room (P1 class, #501 and #502), two 66-seat divided coaches (P2 class, #511 and #512), ten 56-seat coaches (P3 class #531–540), four 36-seat dining cars (D1 class, #491–494) and two lounge-tavern-observation cars (P4 class, #581 and #582). Some of the P3 and two of the D1 cars were for the Pocohantas. They were smooth-sided and delivered in Tuscan red and black. Of the ten P3 cars, seven may still be in some type of operation. Several of these cars were used in the Norfolk Southern Steam Program. According to surviving drawings, the N&W streamlined/lightweight trains were originally supposed to be painted as follows: sides, ends and skirts "Tuscan red", roofs "dark brown" with trucks "Pullman green", and lettering/striping "gold leaf".

During the early 1950s the lettering and striping was changed to imitation (Dulux) gold, while the roofs and trucks were repainted black. The heavyweight cars were painted the same as before but did not carry train name logos or striping. After absorbing the 1964 Wabash Railroad by merger, the N&W "officially" adopted blue and yellow as passenger colors at the end of 1965. The repaints were not all done right away.

The Powhattan Arrow made its last run in 1969, two years before the end of all N&W passenger train service.

Equipment 

The 1949 edition of the Powhatan Arrow carried coaches, a tavern-lounge, and a dining car. The coaches and tavern-lounges were drawn from a pool of 15 coaches built by Pullman-Standard in 1941 for the Pocahontas. Three of the coaches were rebuilt as tavern-lounges. Each car had a coach seating area, a lounge area with chair seating for 20 plus two four-top tables. The N&W would replace the coach seating section with additional lounge seats. The dining cars were Pullman-Standard heavyweight cars from 1927.

Derailments
 On June 12, 1946, No. 604 hauled the eastbound Powhatan Arrow after departing Cincinnati, Ohio, at 8:10 a.m. for Norfolk. At 3:18 p.m., the locomotive derailed four miles west of Powhatan, West Virginia, due to excessive speed at 56 mph, killing engineer Grover C. “Nap” Roberts and fireman Beecher Lawson. These injuries included 23 passengers, three dining car employees, and one train service employee.
 On February 20, 1948, No. 607 derailed near Franklin Furnace, Ohio, while hauling the Powhatan Arrow, killing its fireman. The cause of the accident was failure to obey an automatic block-signal and entering a turnout at an excessive speed of 77 mph.

Notes

References 
 
 
 
 Norfolk and Western Railway, (October 27, 1957). Passenger Timetable, Table 1 p. 6, Table 11 pp. 14–15.

External links
 Powhatan Arrow, August 1950 - Streamliner Schedules

Further reading 
 

Passenger trains of the Norfolk and Western Railway
Named passenger trains of the United States
Railway services introduced in 1946
1969 disestablishments in the United States
Passenger rail transportation in Ohio
Passenger rail transportation in Virginia
Passenger rail transportation in Washington, D.C.
Passenger rail transportation in West Virginia
Railway services discontinued in 1969